The 73rd Pennsylvania House of Representatives District is located in central Pennsylvania and has been represented by Dallas Kephart since 2023.

District profile
The 73rd District is located in Cambria County and Clearfield County and includes the following areas:

Cambria County

 Barr Township
Carrolltown
East Carroll
Elder Township
 Hastings
 Northern Cambria
Patton
Susquehanna Township
 West Carroll Township

Clearfield County

Beccaria Township
 Bigler Township
Boggs Township
Bradford Township
 Brisbin
 Burnside
 Burnside Township
 Chester Hill
Chest Township
 Clearfield
 Coalport
 Cooper Township
Covington Township
 Decatur Township
Girard Township
Goshen Township
 Glen Hope
Graham Township
 Gulich Township
 Houtzdale
 Irvona
 Jordan Township
Karthaus Township
 Knox Township
 Lawrence Township
 Morris Township
 Osceola Mills
 Pike Township
 Ramey
 Wallaceton
 Westover
 Woodward Township

Representatives

References

Government of Cambria County, Pennsylvania
Government of Clearfield County, Pennsylvania
73